Mynor Ramirez (born 25 July 1972) is a Guatemalan former wrestler who competed in the 1992 Summer Olympics and in the 1996 Summer Olympics as well as the 1991 and 1995 Pan American Games.

References

External links
 

1972 births
Living people
Olympic wrestlers of Guatemala
Wrestlers at the 1992 Summer Olympics
Wrestlers at the 1996 Summer Olympics
Pan American Games competitors for Guatemala
Wrestlers at the 1991 Pan American Games
Wrestlers at the 1995 Pan American Games
Guatemalan male sport wrestlers